The 2009 InterLiga was the 6th edition of the tournament that determined the last two Mexican spots in the 2009 Copa Libertadores.

Venues

Qualification
The eight qualified teams were the eight best-positioned teams in the 2008 Apertura general table who did not qualify for the 2009 Copa Libertadores (San Luis) directly and did not qualify for the 2008–09 CONCACAF Champions League from the previous season (Atlante, UNAM, Cruz Azul, and Santos Laguna).

Group stage

Group A

Group B

Finals

Goalscorers
As of 12 January 2009.

4 goals
  Carlos Ochoa (Guadalajara)
  Edgar Benítez (Pachuca)

2 goals
  Jorge Achucarro (Atlas)
  Bruno Marioni (Atlas)
  Sergio Santana (Toluca)
  Gonzalo Vargas (Atlas)

1 goal
  Sergio Ávila (Guadalajara)
  Jean Beausejour (América)
  Ariel Bogado (UANL)
  Edy Brambila (Pachuca)
  Salvador Cabañas (América)
  Andrés Chitiva (América)
  Robert de Pinho (América)
  Hugo Droguett (Morelia)

1 goal (cont.)
  Marco Fabian (Guadalajara)
  Christian Giménez (Pachuca)
  Diego Jiménez (UAG)
  Lucas Lobos (UANL)
  Victor Mañón (Pachuca)
  Guillermo Marino (UANL)
  Alberto Medina (Guadalajara)
  Andres Mendoza (Morelia)
  Ramón Morales (Guadalajara)
  Raúl Nava (Toluca)
  Edgar Pacheco (Atlas)
  Marco Pérez (Pachuca)
  Sergio Ponce (Guadalajara)
  Fernando Salazar (Morelia)
  Wilson Tiago (Morelia)
  Enrique Vera (América)

See also
2009 Copa Libertadores
Primera División de México

References

External links 
Official site 

Inter
2009 domestic association football cups
2009